Everybody Loves a Clown may refer to:

 "Everybody Loves a Clown" (song), a song written by Thomas Leslie, Gary Lewis, and Leon Russell and was recorded by Gary Lewis & the Playboys for their 1965 album, Everybody Loves a Clown
 Episode 24 of Supernatural Season 2
 Everybody Loves a Clown (album), a 1965 album by American band Gary Lewis & the Playboys